Stephen James Blackwood (born 1975) is a Canadian-American scholar, cultural commentator, and social entrepreneur.

Early life and education
Blackwood was born in Alberta, Canada, and grew up in Prince Edward Island. He is the eldest of ten children. He was educated at the University of King's College (BA), Dalhousie University (MA), and Emory University (PhD).

Career
Blackwood is the founding president of Ralston College, a university in Savannah, Georgia.

Blackwood lectures and writes on the intellectual and cultural development of the West, and specializes in the history of philosophy, especially Boethius. Oxford University Press published his book The Consolation of Boethius as Poetic Liturgy in 2015.

Blackwood was a founding executive director of St George's YouthNet, an educational mentoring program for inner-city youth in the North End district of Halifax, Nova Scotia. He was subsequently a teaching fellow in the Foundation Year Programme  at the University of King's College. He is a member of the Cambridge Centre for the Study of Platonism and sits on the Board of the Neuroendocrine Tumor Research Foundation.

He has argued in defense of the integrity of the private sphere and in opposition to Obamacare. His op-ed in the Wall Street Journal about his mother's loss of her cancer coverage as a consequence of the Affordable Care Act was read on the floor of the US Senate and entered into the Congressional Record.

Blackwood was the host and moderator of a conversation between Jordan Peterson and Sir Roger Scruton at Cambridge University on November 2, 2018. He also moderated a debate called “Happiness: Capitalism vs. Marxism” between Slavoj Žižek and Peterson on April 19, 2019.

Blackwood is the founding president of Ralston College, a degree-granting college in Savannah, Georgia.

References

External links 

Higher Ed – Time to Begin Again
The Consolation of Boethius as Poetic Liturgy
 

Living people
1975 births
University of King's College alumni
Dalhousie University alumni
Emory University alumni
American humanities academics
Canadian Anglicans
American Episcopalians
Social entrepreneurs
Free speech activists